Emamzadeh Ali Akbar (also Romanized as Emāmzādeh ‘Alī Akbar) is a village in Hoseynabad-e Kordehha Rural District, in the Central District of Aradan County, Semnan Province, Iran. At the 2006 census, its population was 25, in 7 families.

References 

Populated places in Aradan County